Cornwallis Maude, 1st Viscount Hawarden (19 September 1729 – 23 August 1803) was an Anglo-Irish peer and politician.

Hawarden was the second son of Sir Robert Maude, 1st Baronet and his wife, Eleanor Cornwallis, daughter of Thomas Cornwallis and Emma Charlton.

Hawarden succeeded to the baronetcy following the death of his unmarried older brother, Thomas Maude, 1st Baron de Montalt, in 1777. He served as the Member of Parliament for Roscommon Borough in the Irish House of Commons between 1783 and 1785. He was created Baron de Montalt of Hawarden in the Peerage of Ireland on 29 June 1785. He was further honoured when he was created Viscount Hawarden, also in the Peerage of Ireland, on 5 December 1793.

He had 16 children with three wives.

References

1729 births
1803 deaths
Viscounts Hawarden
Irish MPs 1783–1790
18th-century Anglo-Irish people
Maude family
Members of the Parliament of Ireland (pre-1801) for County Roscommon constituencies
Peers of Ireland created by George III